Bargoshad (also Romanized as Bargoshād) is a village in Lakestan Rural District, in the Central District of Salmas County, West Azerbaijan Province, Iran. At the 2006 census, its population was 437, in 103 families.

References 

Populated places in Salmas County